The Church of San Roman (Spanish: Iglesia de San Román) is a medieval church in Sariego, Asturias, Spain. San Román  is one of three parishes in the municipality of Sariego.

The building is Romanesque in appearance but has older origins, as evidenced in the fenestration (a window is dated to the 10th century).

See also
 Church of Santiago (Sariego)

References

Churches in Asturias with Pre-Romanesque work